Sir Andrew Peter Leggatt, PC (8 November 1930 – 21 February 2020) was a British judge who served as the Lord Justice of Appeal and as a member of the Privy Council.  He was noted for his acerbic wit and precise, well-written judgements.  As a barrister, his clients included Paul McCartney and Robert Bolt.

Biography
He was educated at Eton College and King's College, Cambridge. He wrote Tribunals for Users – One System, One Service, published by the Department for Constitutional Affairs. He liked the English language and literature and was a member of the Queen's English Society.

He had two children, George and Alice. His son, George, is also a judge and was appointed to the UK Supreme Court before his father's death.

Judgments
Johnstone v Bloomsbury Health Authority [1991] 2 All ER 293, dissenting
Vaughan v Barlow Clowes International Ltd [1991] EWCA Civ 11 – an English trusts law case, concerning tracing
Nestle v National Westminster Bank plc [1992] EWCA Civ 12, duty of care for investment
Fitzpatrick v British Railways Board [1992] ICR 221, [1992] IRLR 376 – United Kingdom labour law, concerning collective bargaining
Johnstone v Bloomsbury HA [1992] QB 333, [1991] 2 WLR 1362, [1991] 2 All ER 293 –  English contract law case, concerning implied terms and unfair terms under the Unfair Contract Terms Act 1977.
Bishopsgate Investment Management Ltd v Maxwell (No 2) [1993] BCLC 814, pension fund misappropriation
Bishopsgate Investment Management Ltd v Homan [1994] EWCA Civ 33 – English trusts law, whether a beneficiary whose fiduciary breaches trust, may trace assets through an overdrawn account to its destination.
Powdrill v Watson [1995] 2 AC 394 – United Kingdom insolvency law, concerning adoption of employment contracts by insolvency practitioners
Westdeutsche Landesbank Girozentrale v Islington LBC [1996] UKHL 12, overturned  – English trusts law case concerning the circumstances under which a resulting trust arises.
Investors Compensation Scheme Ltd v West Bromwich Building Society [1997] UKHL 28, overturned – English contract law, which laid down that a contextual approach must be taken to the interpretation of contracts.
Fujitsu's Application [1997] EWCA Civ 1174 – confirming the rejection of a patent involving the computerisation of an existing process.

Notes

1930 births
2020 deaths
British writers
Alumni of King's College, Cambridge
Knights Bachelor
Lords Justices of Appeal
Members of the Privy Council of the United Kingdom
People educated at Eton College